Louis Jean Dufaux (21 October 1931 – 14 April 2011) was the Roman Catholic bishop of the Roman Catholic Diocese of Grenoble-Vienne, France.

Ordained to the priesthood in 1958, Dufaux was named an auxiliary bishop in 1984. In 1988, he was named coadjutor bishop of the Grenoble-Vienne Diocese becoming bishop in 1989. Bishop Dufaux retired in 2006.

Notes

1931 births
2011 deaths
Bishops of Grenoble